Intramolgus is a monotypic genus of crustaceans belonging to the monotypic family Intramolgidae. The only species is Intramolgus arcticus.

The species is found in the White Sea.

References

Cyclopoida
Cyclopoida genera
Monotypic crustacean genera